Alois Hotschnig (born 3 October 1959) is an Austrian writer, whose stories have been described as having "the weird, creepy, and ambiguous quality of disturbing dreams". He first studied medicine, then German and English in Innsbruck. He was winner of the Erich Fried Prize in 2008, the Anton Wildgans Prize in 2009, and shortlisted for the Jan Michalski Prize for Literature in 2010. He lives as a freelance author in Innsbruck.

Works

References

External links
 
 

1959 births
Living people
20th-century Austrian novelists
21st-century Austrian novelists
Austrian male novelists
Austrian male short story writers
20th-century short story writers
21st-century short story writers
20th-century Austrian male writers
21st-century male writers